{{Infobox settlement
| name                    = Badgaon
| other_name              = kanta wali Badgaon
| nickname                = Badgoan Bandh 
| settlement_type         = Village
| image_skyline           = 
| image_alt               = 
| image_caption           = 
| pushpin_map             = India Rajasthan#India
| pushpin_label_position  = 
| pushpin_map_alt         = 
| pushpin_map_caption     = Location in Rajasthan, India
| coordinates             = 
| subdivision_type        = Country
| subdivision_name        = 
| subdivision_type1       = State
| subdivision_name1       = Rajasthan
| subdivision_type2       = District
| subdivision_name2       = Udaipur
| established_title       = 
| established_date        = 
| founder                 = 
| government_type         = 
| governing_body          = Sarpanch 
(Mrs. Dhapu Bai Gadari w/o Bhera ji Gadari )
| leader_name             = Dhapu Bai Gadari 
| unit_pref               = Metric
| area_footnotes          = 
| area_rank               = 
| area_total_             = 2KM
| population_total        = 2657  
| population_as_of        = 2011
| population_rank         = 
| population_density_km2  = auto
| population_demonym      = 
| population_footnotes    = 
| elevation_footnotes     = 
| elevation_m             = 502

| demographics_type1      = Languages
| demographics1_title1    = Official
| demographics1_info1     = Hindi
| timezone1               = IST
| utc_offset1             = +5:30
| postal_code_type        = PIN
| postal_code             = 313205
| area_code_type          = STD
| area_code               = 02955
| registration_plate      = RJ-27
| blank1_name_sec1        = Sex ratio
| blank1_info_sec1        = 1000/1019♂/♀
| iso_code                = RJ-IN
| footnotes               =

}}Badgaon is a village in Mavli tehsil of Udaipur district in the Indian state of Rajasthan.

 Occupation 
Main occupation of people is agriculture and government/private jobs. Some villagers are employed in government services and many people are doing private jobs in other states and 10-15 villagers job in Dubai and other countries 

 Temple and holy places 
Main Temple in this village is Shree Charbhuja Ji Temple ( Thakur Ji ) . The temple is situated in the centar of the village . This temple is biggest in nearby temple of other nearby villages. Two small temples also created in the temple, one is God shiva and other is God Hanuman. There are two elephant statue created both site of main gate. The main gates are made of steel. Now this temple is famous for its glass creativity .

 God Shiva's Temple (Back site of Charbhuja Ji Temple)
 Goddess Chamunda Mata Temple (Left Site of charbhuja Ji Temple)
 Teja Ji Temple
 Dharmraj Ji Temple (Front site of charbhuja Ji Temple)
 Rebari Baoji Temple
 Radaji Baoji 
 Bheruji Baoji
 Kalaji Baoji
 Sethiyo ki Sati Mata

 Transport Badgaon Bandh is connected to nearby villages through the road network with Private Bus Services which link it to Udaipur, Mavli, Fatehnagar, vallabhnagar, Akola.Badgoan kanta link with road network in east kir ki choki, weat mavli, north fatehnagar and south menar ka bangla.

 Demographics 
 State Census, Badgaon had a population of 2657. Male population is 1316, while female population is 1341.
Sex ratio of Badgaon village is 1019''' which is higher than Rajasthan state average of 928 .
And literacy rate of Badgaon village is 46.59% while male literacy is 64.16% and female literacy is 29.77% .

References

Villages in Udaipur district